Evelyn Irene Hoopes Teegan (born November 17, 1931, Muscatine County, Iowa) was a non-career appointee who served concurrent appointments as the American Ambassador Extraordinary and Plenipotentiary to Kiribati, Tuvalu, Fiji, and Tonga from November 21, 1989, to March 5, 1993.

A housewife from Edina, Minnesota, Teegan had served as a Republican National Committeewoman.  She was Vice President of Teegan and Associates in Minneapolis since 1987.  She graduated from Iowa State University in 1953.

References

Ambassadors of the United States to Fiji
Ambassadors of the United States to Kiribati
Ambassadors of the United States to Tonga
Ambassadors of the United States to Tuvalu
Iowa State University alumni
People from Muscatine County, Iowa
American women ambassadors
1931 births
Living people
20th-century American diplomats
20th-century American women
21st-century American women